Agia Varvara is the name of several towns :

Cyprus

Agia Varvara, Nicosia, a village in Nicosia District
Agia Varvara, Paphos, a village in Paphos District

Greece

Agia Varvara, a suburb of Athens
Agia Varvara, Akrata, a village in eastern Achaea
Agia Varvara, Tritaia, a village in Tritaia, western Achaea
Agia Varvara, Heraklion, a municipality on Crete
Agia Varvara (island), an islet situated close to the northern coast of Crete, near Malia

Other uses

SS Agia Varvara, a ship